The Old Dhakaites are an Indo-Aryan ethnocultural group viewed as the original inhabitants of Dhaka. They are sometimes referred to as simply Dhakaiya. Their history dates back to the Mughal period with the migration of Bengali cultivators and merchants to the city. The cultivators came to be known as Kutti and they speak Dhakaiya Kutti, a dialect of Bengali and the merchants came to be known as Khoshbas and speak Dhakaiya Urdu. There are sizeable populations in other parts of Bangladesh. The Dhakaiyas maintain a distinct identity in addition to their Bengali identity, due to cultural, linguistic, geographical and historical reasons. They have been described as a wealthy but very closed-off community; evidently being a minority in their own hometown. It is said that some people living in Greater Dhaka are even unaware of the existence of an Urdu-speaking non-Bihari minority community although their presence dates back centuries.

History

During the Mughal era, the Bengal Subah was famous for rice cultivation and the city of Jahangirnagar (now Old Dhaka) was the province's capital. Rice was a very important export product in the mid-eighteenth century, centred in Dhaka. The merchants who exported the rice were predominantly Marwaris and Central Indians of noble descent. These merchants would go to different areas in Eastern Bengal and collect the rice. The rice was first needed to be cleaned up using  before packaging, and this process is called  (কুটা)  in Bengali. Many local rice cultivators from villages across Bengal were employed to do this. They would travel to the city to complete this job, and as it was lengthy journey, many of them started to permanently start residing in Dhaka. This migration took place circa 1760. However, not all were involved in the rice trade. The interactions with different cultures and languages led to the birth of an Urdu-influenced dialect of Bengali known as Dhakaiya Kutti, and with that - a new identity.

The merchants from North India also eventually settled in Dhaka and came to be known as  meaning happily-settled. Originally an Urdu-speaking community, their time in Bengal led to the emergence of a Bengali-influenced dialect known as Dhakaiya Urdu as they were a minority in comparison to the Kuttis.

Many of the Kutti community became a lot wealthier over the years due to their occupation and many became landowners. With thousands of Kutti being involved in the rice supplying industry by 1787, they also formed a merchant class by monopolising rice retail in the city. Notable landowners in New Paltan included Gulenur Khatun and Ayub Ali Sardar. Khatun owned a large portion of the northern part of New Paltan where she also owned a thatched hut residence as well as a tea stall. Named as Lalur Maar Dokan (লালুর মার দোকান, Lalu's mother's shop), it was located just beside the 3rd gate of the erstwhile East Pakistan Rifles. Sardar, who lived on the other side of Khatun's tea stall, was a horse operator and had a number of horses. These horses would engage in horse races in the famous Ramna Race Course, from which not only he made a fortune from, but also won medals from the British Raj. They can also be found in other localities such as Narinda.

Presently, the Old Dhakaiyas are a minority in Dhaka following the mass migration of Bengalis from districts all over Bengal during the first and second partitions during the British colonial period. With the expansion of the city, new residential areas were created to supply housing to the more recent migrants. The traditional trade hub at Sadarghat was shifted to Nilkhet and Gulistan, decreasing Old Dhakaiya influence. The new educated migrant 
community (now also commonly known as Dhakaiyas with the former now being referred to as "Old Dhakaiyas") spoke in Standard Bengali, the standardised register of Bengali. Some of the Old Dhakaiya community began to see the new migrant community as their opponents due to these linguistic and cultural differences. This division was the source of modern troubles in the identities of the Old Dhakaiyas (who view themselves as original inhabitants) and the post-partition migrant community (who currently form the majority in the city).

Culture

Clothing
A common tradition of the Kutti group was that they would wear white shirts and white lungis. The Khoshbas would dress very formally, sporting black sherwanis. Covering ones head in both communities is seen as more respectful, and notable headgear include the tupi, karakul, rumi topi and taqi. Women are famed for the Dhakai jamdani-sari, a clothing originating in Dhaka using a fine muslin textile. Dating back centuries, it is popular amongst Bengalis in general. The traditional art of weaving jamdani was patronised by the Mughals but under British colonial rule, the jamdani and muslin industries rapidly declined due to colonial import policies favouring industrially manufactured textiles. In more recent years, the production of jamdani has witnessed a revival in Bangladesh and in 2013, UNESCO classed it as an Intangible Cultural Heritage of Humanity. In 2016, Bangladesh received geographical indication (GI) status for the Jamdani Sari.

Cuisine

Dhakaiya food is one of the most notable regional Bangladeshi cuisines. The rich culinary customs are influenced by Mughlai, Central Asian, Armenian, Hindustani and Bengali cuisines. However, it also has dishes unique to Dhaka. Haji biryani is a dish, invented by a restaurateur in 1939, made with highly seasoned rice, goat's meat and number of spices and nuts. The restaurant has become an integral part of Dhakaiya culture. Old Dhaka boasts a variation of the famous pilaf - the Morog Polao - in which the rice is cooked after and the chicken pieces are cut. Dhakaiyas are noted for introducing paneer and boiled eggs to khichuri. Dhakai bakarkhani is a thick, biscuit-like flat-bread which is a traditional street-food snack, famed for its quality and taste. It is mainly dished up with tea. Dhakaiyas proudly hold a heritage of creating the best khili paan using various herbs and spices. They also offer a khili paan for diabetic patients called the "paan afsana". Common Dhakaiya beverages include borhani, Rooh Afza, shorbot, traditional fruit juices as well as basil seed-based drinks. Falooda, shahi jilapi and shemai are popular sweet foods and desserts.

Festivals

In the holy Islamic month of Ramadan, it was a custom for every household to send a food offering to their local mosque. A dostorkhan would be laid in the mosque for the fasting people to eat on. Chowk Bazaar was one of the most famous business and social meeting centres of Old Dhaka in the Mughal period and even today, during Ramadan, it is famous for the availability of hundreds of Iftar items. At the end of the month, Chowk Bazaar would host a two-day mela for the celebration of Eid al-Fitr. Popular toys and gifts, known as eidi, emerged in the Dhakaiya culture such as the bhotbhoti; a motor using kerosene that would spin around in water, as well as the drum-carriage. Hakim Habibur Rahman mentions in his book, Dhaka Panchas Baras Pahle (Dhaka, fifty years ago) that during sehri time (pre-dawn), groups of people would sing qasidas to wake up the neighbourhood. This tradition was patronised by the nawabs and sardars of Dhaka and on Eid day, the Chief Sardar would present awards and baksheesh to the best qasida singers. Qasidas were generally sung in Urdu but in the 1980s, Bengali qasidas also came into fashion. This tradition is experiencing a revival with the efforts from the likes of Shamsher Rahman of Posta. Qawwalis as well as Urdu poetry recital was very common amongst the Khoshbas in particular.

The Shakrain festival is an age-long Dhakaiya kiting tradition celebrating the arrival of winter in the Bengali calendar. Kite fighters would assemble in their rooftops, lighting up the skyline. Dhakaiya weddings are also typically seen as very "extravagant". Other sports that were popular amongst Old Dhakaiyas were hockey, horse riding and Nouka Baich (boat racing). The latter was originally practised in rural areas, but its popularity in urban areas increased in the 18th century as the Nawabs would organise many races.

Language

Two languages emerged in Old Dhaka during the Mughal period due to the interactions between the Urdu and Bengali speakers. The Khoshbas and the Nawabs of Dhaka spoke a Bengali-influenced dialect of Urdu known as Dhakaiya Urdu (which is distinct to the Hindustani creole spoken by the Bihari community). The Kuttis spoke Dhakaiya Kutti, a Bengali dialect with an Urdu influence. Humour is an important part of Kutti culture and in the past, their jokes - told in the Dhakaiya Kutti language - used to generally consist of short stories in which Dhakaiyas mess around with the bhadralok gentry. The Kuttis refer to outsiders or non-Dhakaiya Bengalis by the name "Gaiya" (গাঁইয়া), meaning from the village, and Kolkatans in particular as Demchi (ডেমচি).

Dhaka was also an esteemed centre for the study of Persian, as it was an official language up until the colonial period and due to the high population of merchants and businessman from Central Asia and Persia that settled in Dhaka. The Naib Nazim of Dhaka Nusrat Jang was known to have written a history book titled Tarikh-i-Nusrat Jangi around the late 18th century. Agha Ahmad Ali is considered to be the greatest among Persian scholars of Bengal, famed for his Persian lexology works like Muayyid-i-Burhan and Shamsher-i-Teztar, rivalling contemporaries like Ghalib, and are still read today across South Asia. He had learn the language at a yougn age, with a local Munshi of Dhaka. The Nawab family of Dhaka were also strong patrons of the Persian language, most notably Haydar Jan Shayeq, Abdur Rahim Saba, Kawkab, Khwaja Ahsanullah, Khwaja Atiqullah, Khwaja Abdul Ghani, Khwaja Muhammad Afzal, Khwaja Yusuf Jan and Khwaja Nazimuddin. The Department of Persian at the University of Dhaka was opened in 1921.

In media
In 2008, Ekushey Television launched a serial called "Tuntuni Villa" centred on an Old Dhakaite family. Shakib Khan played an Old Dhakaiya character in the 2015 Dhallywood film "Love Marriage".

Notables

Shamsur Rahman, Bengali poet, columnist and journalist
Hakim Habibur Rahman, Unani physician, historian, editor of Al Mashriq (Dhaka's first Urdu newspaper)
Agha Ahmad Ali, scholar of Persian and Urdu poet
Bulbul Ahmed, actor and film director
Sayeed Ahmed, playwright
Muhammad Enamul Huq,CSP officer and Ex Establishment secretary of Bangladesh Government.

See also
Nawab of Dhaka, the largest erstwhile zamindari family in Bengal and Assam
Biharis in Bangladesh, another Urdu-speaking community in Bangladesh
Nassakh, Urdu poet of nearby Faridpur
Mahifarash, Dhakaiya fishmonger community

References

Indo-Aryan peoples
Old Dhaka
Ethnic groups in Bangladesh
People from Dhaka
Culture in Dhaka